Ophrys reinholdii is a species of orchid. Its native range from Croatia in southeastern Europe to northwestern Iran in western Asia, including Bulgaria, Greece, Turkey and Cyprus.

Subspecies
Two subspecies are currently recognized (May 2022):

Ophrys reinholdii subsp. straussii (H.Fleischm. & Bornm.) E.Nelson - Turkey, Syria
Ophrys reinholdii subsp. reinholdii - from Croatia to Turkey

References

reinholdii
Flora of Southeastern Europe
Flora of Western Asia
Plants described in 1908